David Daniel Masters (born 22 April 1978) is a former English cricketer who played for Kent, Leicestershire and Essex County Cricket Clubs between 2000 and 2016.

Masters was born at Chatham in Kent in 1978 and educated at Fort Luton High School and Mid-Kent College. He made his senior cricket debut for Kent in 2000 as a seam bowler. He left Kent to join Leicestershire ahead of the 2003 season and was named the county's player of the year in 2005 after taking 45 wickets in all competitions. In August 2007 he agreed to join Essex on a three-year contract, remaining with the county from the start of the 2008 season until he retired at the end of the 2016 season.

Masters took 672 first-class wickets in his 16 year career. He was described as a "nagging medium-paced journeyman" and a "dependable performer" who led the Essex bowling attack in the later years of his career as a "metronomically reliable leader". He bowled a range of seam bowling variations and moved the ball reliably. He was praised on his retirement for his "skill, consistency and longevity".

Masters' best bowling performance was figures of 8/10 taken against Leicestershire at Southend in 2011. During the off-season he worked in the family building firm, initially as a labourer, preferring to keep fit by working rather than in the gym, and in his later career as a contract manager.

Masters' father Kevin played briefly for Kent in the 1980s. His brother Daniel played briefly for Leicestershire between 2009 and 2010.

References

External links

1978 births
Living people
English cricketers
Kent cricketers
Leicestershire cricketers
Essex cricketers
Sportspeople from Chatham, Kent